John Wheatley (19 May 1869 – 12 May 1930) was a Scottish socialist politician. He was a prominent figure of the Red Clydeside era.

Early life and career
Wheatley was born to Thomas and Johanna Wheatley in Bonmahon, County Waterford, Ireland.  In 1876 the family moved to Braehead, Lanarkshire in Scotland. Initially—as his father had done in Ireland—he worked as a miner in the Baillieston district. After that he worked briefly as a publican.

Wheatley then started a successful printing business, which published leftist political works. He wrote many of them, including How the Miners Were Robbed (1907),
The Catholic Workingman (1909), Miners, Mines and Misery (1909), Eight Pound Cottages for Glasgow Citizens (1913), Municipal Banking (1920) and The New Rent Act (1920).

He was a deeply religious man and a practising Roman Catholic. Influenced by early Christian-socialist thinkers, in 1907 he joined the Independent Labour Party (ILP). He founded and was the first chairman of the Catholic Socialist Society.

Against the UK's involvement in World War I, he campaigned against conscription and assisted in organising rent strikes in Glasgow.

As a councillor on Glasgow's city council, he became one of the best known in the city, and was elected to the House of Commons in the 1922 General Election for Glasgow Shettleston. He was a great supporter of Celtic Football Club.

Labour leader Ramsay MacDonald sometimes disapproved of Wheatley's debating methods, as well as his friendship with James Maxton. ( Maxton was suspended from the Commons on one occasion when he called Conservative MP Sir Frederick Banbury "a murderer" for a proposed cut in child welfare.)  But Wheatley continued to work closely with his ILP colleagues in the Parliamentary Labour Party, especially Maxton.

Wheatley was known as the intellectual behind the ILP activities. Along with many ILP MPs, especially those from Clydeside, he found himself drifting from MacDonald's Labour leadership. Wheatley remained a widely respected political figure and when MacDonald became Prime Minister in January 1924, he appointed Wheatley as his Minister of Health. Wheatley is best remembered for his Housing (Financial Provisions) Act 1924, which saw a massive expansion in affordable municipal housing for the working class.

On 9 May 1924, H. G. Wells led a delegation to ask for birth control reforms. The delegation asked for two things: that institutions under Ministry of Health control should give contraceptive advice to those who asked for it; and that doctors at welfare centres should be allowed to offer advice in certain medical cases. Wheatley held strong views against birth control and refused to support the campaign. 

Wheatley criticised MacDonald for moving Labour to the right. Consequently he did not hold a post in the Labour Government which formed after the 1929 United Kingdom general election. He refused to support many of the measures proposed by MacDonald's government. Along with Maxton (now Wheatley's leader in the ILP) he became one of the Labour-left's leading critics.

Death and legacy
John Wheatley died on 12 May 1930, one week before his 61st birthday.

Wheatley Housing Group (Scotland's largest registered social landlord) and John Wheatley College (now Glasgow Kelvin College) in Glasgow are named after him. His nephew, John Thomas Wheatley, became a Labour MP for Edinburgh East in 1947 and Lord Advocate.

Further reading

Non-fiction
Spartacus Educational Biography http://www.spartacus-educational.com/TUwheatley.htm On-line teaching aid by John SimkinJohn Wheatley by Ian Wood (Manchester University Press 1990)The Life of John Wheatley by John Hannan (Spokesman Books 1988)

Fiction
No Mean Affair by Robert Ronsson (Foxwell Press 2012)

References

External links
 
John Wheatley & the 1924 Housing Act - UK Parliament Living Heritage
 "John Wheatley: The Labour lion who led", Richard Leonard, Tribune, 12 May 2010
 "Was John Wheatley really a working-class hero?", Robert Ronsson, New Statesman, 29 August 2012

1869 births
1930 deaths
British anti–World War I activists
Members of the Privy Council of the United Kingdom
Politicians from County Waterford
Politicians from Glasgow
Baillieston
Councillors in Glasgow
Scottish printers
Scottish Roman Catholics
Scottish political writers
Independent Labour Party MPs
Independent Labour Party National Administrative Committee members
Members of the Parliament of the United Kingdom for Glasgow constituencies
UK MPs 1922–1923
UK MPs 1923–1924
UK MPs 1924–1929
UK MPs 1929–1931
Scottish miners
Scottish socialists
Red Clydeside
British publicans
Catholic socialists
Scottish Labour MPs
Scottish people of Irish descent